Piusa Caves Nature Reserve is nature reserve in Piusa, Võru County, Estonia. Its area is 48 ha. Goals of nature reserve are to protect Piusa caves and bats who live in caves.

In 1981 Piusa caves were taken under protection and in 1992 the nature reserve was formed.

References

Nature reserves in Estonia
Võru Parish
Geography of Võru County
Caves of Estonia